The Qingchuan Bridge is an arch bridge located in Wuhan, People's Republic of China. It is the fourth bridge on the Han River, the third motorway bridge (provisional name being "Third Jianghan Bridge") and also the "Rainbow Bridge" due to its shape and red color. The construction of this bridge begins on Dec 20, 1997, and completed in 2000, which started revenue service to the public. It has four lanes, connects Yanhe Ave in Hankou with Hannan Rd in Hanyang. It used to be a tolled bridge, but after the implementation of electronic toll collection in Wuhan, the toll plaza was razed.

See also
List of longest arch bridge spans

References

Arch bridges in China
Bridges in Hubei
Former toll bridges